Labropsis is a genus of wrasses native to the Indian and Pacific Oceans.

Species
The currently recognized species in this genus are:
 Labropsis alleni J. E. Randall, 1981 (Allen's tubelip)
 Labropsis australis J. E. Randall, 1981 (southern tubelip)
 Labropsis manabei P. J. Schmidt, 1931 (northern tubelip)
 Labropsis micronesica J. E. Randall, 1981 (Micronesian wrasse)
 Labropsis polynesica J. E. Randall, 1981
 Labropsis xanthonota J. E. Randall, 1981 (yellow-back tubelip)

References

Labridae
Marine fish genera